Loei (Thai: เลย), is one of the more sparsely populated provinces (changwat) of Thailand. It lies in the Isan region of upper northeastern Thailand. Neighboring provinces are (from east clockwise) Nong Khai, Udon Thani, Nong Bua Lamphu, Khon Kaen, Phetchabun, and Phitsanulok. In the north it borders Xaignabouli and Vientiane province of Laos.

, the provincial governor is Chaiwat Chuenkosum. The province was allocated 225.6 million baht in the FY2019 Thailand budget.

Geography 

The province is mountainous. The seat of provincial government, Loei, is in a fertile basin surrounded by mountains whose summits are covered by fog and abundant varied flora. The best known mountains in the province are Phu Kradueng, Phu Luang, and Phu Ruea. The Loei River, which flows through the province, is a tributary of the Mekong, which forms part of the northern boundary of the province with neighboring Laos. Phu Thap Buek, the highest mountain of the Phetchabun Range, is in the province.
The mountain Phu Kradueng is in Phu Kradueng National Park (อุทยานแห่งชาติภูกระดึง).
The western part of the province reaches the southern end of the Luang Prabang Range of the Thai highlands.

National parks
There are four national parks, along with two other national parks, make up region 8 (Khon Kaen), and Na Yung–Nam Som in region 10 (Udon Thani) and Phu Hin Rong Kla region 11 (Phitsanulok) of Thailand's protected areas.
 Na Yung–Nam Som National Park, 
 Phu Pha Man National Park, 
 Phu Kradueng National Park, 
 Phu Hin Rong Kla National Park, 
 Phu Ruea National Park, 
 Phu Suan Sai National Park,

Wildlife sanctuaries
There are three wildlife sanctuaries, two ofwhich are in region 8 (Khon Kaen), and Phu Khat in region 11 (Phitsanulok) of Thailand's protected areas.
 Phu Luang Wildlife Sanctuary, 
 Phu Khat Wildlife Sanctuary, 
 Phu Kho–Phu Kratae Wildlife Sanctuary,

History
It is thought that Loei was founded by people from Chiang Saen, the capital of Lan Na. Khun Pha Muang founded the village of Dan-kwa, and Bang Klang Hao founded Dan Sai. Drought and disease later led to the villagers move to the site of present-day Loei. 

In 1907, King Chulalongkorn (Rama V) created Loei province. The Loei Cultural Centre (ศูนย์วัฒนธรรมจังหวัดเลย) displays Loei's history, religions, and traditions.

Symbols
The seal of the province shows the stupa at Phra That Si Song Rak, which was built in 1560 by King Maha Chakrapat of the Ayutthaya Kingdom and King Saysettha  of Lan Xang as a symbol of friendship between the two kingdoms. The provincial tree is the Khasi pine (Pinus kesiya).

The provincial slogan is "city of the sea of mountains, coldest place in Siam, with beautiful flowers of three seasons."

Economy
Agriculture drives Loei's economy. Macadamia nuts, passion fruit, and Arabica coffee are grown in the highlands; bananas, sesame, and rubber on the plains. Loei is an ecotourism destination due to its natural environment and amalgam of northern and northeastern cultures.

Wang Saphung District is the site of a large open pit gold mine that employs many locals. The locality has been the site of a long-standing dispute as well as physical conflict between the villagers of Ban Na Nong Bong and its environs and Tungkum Limited, a subsidiary of Tongkah Harbour PCL. Tungkum's gold mining operation has been accused in the courts of environmental destruction.

Administrative divisions

Provincial government

The province is divided into 14 districts (amphoe). The districts are further divided into 89 subdistricts (tambons) and 839 villages (mubans).

Local government
As of 26 November 2019 there are: one Loei Provincial Administration Organisation and 29 municipal (thesaban) areas in the province. Loei with Wang Saphung have town (thesaban mueang) status. There are a further 27 subdistrict municipalities (thesaban tambon). The non-municipal areas are administered by 71 Subdistrict Administrative Organisations, SAO (ongkan borihan suan tambon).

Transport
Route 201 leads from Chiang Khan in the north on the border with Laos, through Loei, to Non Sa-at near Chum Phae. Route 203 leads west to the vicinity of Phu Ruea, and then turns south to Lom Sak.

Loei is served by Loei Airport.

Human achievement index 2017

Since 2003, United Nations Development Programme (UNDP) in Thailand has tracked progress on human development at the provincial level using the Human achievement index (HAI), a composite index measuring eight key areas of human development. The National Economic and Social Development Board (NESDB) has taken over this task since 2017.

Gallery

References

External links

Provincial website
Local website of Loei (Thai version) : Outloei.com

 
Isan
Provinces of Thailand